Sphegina verecunda is a species of hoverfly in the family Syrphidae.

Distribution
England.

References

Eristalinae
Insects described in 1937
Diptera of Europe
Taxa named by James Edward Collin